Antonio da Faenza (either circa 1454 or more likely 1480s - 1534) was an Italian painter and architect active in Emilia-Romagna and Marche, active in a Renaissance style. The documentation on Antonio da Faenza is confused because, different authors have referred to him by various names including:
Antonio Liberi
Antonio di Mazzone
Antonio Domenichi

Some also attempt to identify him with Antonio Gentile, a contemporary goldsmith.

Biography
His first works are now lost but were painted in Velletri in 1509. The original biographical sketch was by Faenza historian Bernardino Azzurini, who also recalls he wrote an architectural treatise.

Among his extant works of painting attributed to Antonio da Faenza are:
 Annunciation (1513), organ doors for Santa Casa di Loreto, now in Pinacoteca del Palazzo Apostolico
 Enthroned Madonna and Child with Saints Peter and Paul (circa 1516), San Pietro, Montelupone 
 Madonna del Latte with Saints including Roch, James the Major, James the Minor, Firmian, and a donor (1525), San Francesco, Montelupone  
 Madonna and Saints (1518), Museo della Castellina, Norcia. 
 Madonna and Child and Saints Michael, Sperandia, Ursula, Barbara, and John the Baptist (1526), Santa Sperandia, Cingoli, 
 Marriage of the Virgin (circa 1526), sacristy of San Esuperanzio, Cingoli
 Mystical Marriage of St Catherine, San Michele, Treia 
 Enthroned Madonna with Saints Peter, Paul, Dominic, Luke, and Mark  (1528), Pinacoteca comunale, Faenza

Among his architectural plans were a design for a bell-tower for the Faenza Cathedral and a fountain in Montelupo. Neither was completed.

Azzurini in his first biography, noted that Antonio had written a treatise on architecture; however, that it had never been published. In 1991 in London, a codex by Antonio of 122 pages with 640 designs was discovered. Dating from 1516 to 1526, it includes sections on optics, arithmetic, geometry, perspective, color, and architecture. It is presumed a Franciscan scholar residing in Montelupone my have mentored the document.

References

15th-century births
1534 deaths
16th-century Italian painters
Italian male painters
Italian Renaissance painters